Bishara Morad (Arabic: بشارة مراد  , ; born 23 January 2003), known simply as Bishara, is a Syrian-Swedish singer. He participated in the Melodifestivalen 2019 with the song "On My Own".

Biography

Early life
Bishara Morad was born in Damascus, Syria and immigrated with his family to the city of Linköping in Sweden when he was six years old.

Career
In 2018, Bishara was asked to sing in the school cafeteria by his music teacher and Bishara, who was unaware of his aptitude for singing, chose to upload a clip from the performance on YouTube and Instagram. Soon after he was discovered by singer, songwriter and music manager Laila Bagge. On 30 January 2019, he released his debut single "Home". And in February of the same year he competed in Melodifestivalen 2019 in the fourth semi-final with the song "On My Own", qualifying to the final.

Personal life
Morad is a Christian belonging to the Syriac Orthodox Church, and has stated that his gift of singing comes from Jesus. He is as well a sub-deacon in St. Markus Syriac Orthodox church in Linköping for its youth group.

Discography

Singles

References

External links

Living people
2003 births
Swedish male singers
Syrian emigrants to Sweden
Swedish people of Assyrian/Syriac descent
Swedish people of Syrian descent
Syriac Orthodox Christians
Swedish Christians
People from Linköping
Swedish child singers
Child pop musicians
Melodifestivalen contestants of 2019